Urie Bronfenbrenner (April 29, 1917 – September 25, 2005) was a Russian-born American psychologist who is most known for his ecological systems theory. His work with the United States government helped in the formation of the Head Start program in 1965. Bronfenbrenner's ability research was key in changing the perspective of developmental psychology by calling attention to the large number of environmental and societal influences on child development.

Biography
Bronfenbrenner was born in Moscow on April 29, 1917, to Russian Jewish parents, the pathologist Alexander Bronfenbrenner and Eugenie Kamenetski. When he was six, his family moved to the United States, first to Pittsburgh, Pennsylvania, and then a year later to a rural part of New York state. His father worked as a neuropathologist at a hospital for the developmentally disabled called Letchworth Village, located in Rockland County, N.Y.

Bronfenbrenner received a bachelor's in psychology and music from Cornell University in Ithaca, New York, in 1938. He earned a master's in education from Harvard in 1940, and a doctorate in developmental psychology from the University of Michigan in 1942. He entered the U.S. military the day after receiving his doctorate, going on to serve as a psychologist in various military bodies during World War II. After the war, he briefly obtained a job as an assistant chief clinical psychologist for the newly founded VA Clinical Psychology Training Program in Washington, D.C. After that, he served as an assistant professor at the University of Michigan for two years, and then moved to Cornell University in 1948 as an assistant professor in the Department of Human Development. At Cornell, his research focused on child development and the impact of social forces in this development for the rest of his career.

He was appointed to a federal panel about development in impoverished children around 1964 and 1965, with this panel helping in the creation of Head Start in 1965.

Bronfenbrenner wrote over 300 research papers and 14 books, and achieved the title of Jacob Gould Schurman Professor Emeritus of Human Development at Cornell University. He was married to Liese Price and had six children.

Death 
He died at his home in Ithaca, New York, on September 25, 2005, at the age of 88, due to complications with diabetes.

Views on human development and ecological systems theory
Bronfenbrenner saw the process of human development as being shaped by the interaction between an individual and their environment. The specific path of development was a result of the influences of a person's surroundings, such as their parents, friends, school, work, culture, and so on. During his time, he saw developmental psychology as only studying individual influences on development in unnatural settings; in his own words, developmental psychology was, "the science of strange behavior of children in strange situations with strange adults for the briefest possible periods of time."

It is from this vantage point that Bronfenbrenner conceives his theory of human development, the ecological systems theory. His theory states that there are many different levels of environmental influences that can affect a child's development, starting from people and institutions immediately surrounding the individual to nationwide cultural forces. He later accounted for the influence of time, such as specific events and changes in culture over time, by adding the chronosystem to the theory. Furthermore, he eventually renamed his theory the bioecological model in order to recognize the importance of biological processes in development. However, he only recognized biology as producing a person's potential, with this potential being realized or not via environmental and social forces.

Head Start
In 1964 Bronfenbrenner testified before a congressional hearing about an antipoverty bill, stating that measures should be directed towards children in order to reduce the effects of poverty on developing persons. This perspective was contrary to the predominant view at the time that child development was purely biological, with no influence of experience or environment on its course. Because of his testimony, he was invited to the White House to discuss the issue with Claudia Alta "Lady Bird" Johnson, with whom he discussed child-care programs of other countries. Furthermore, he was invited to a federal panel that was tasked with developing a method to counteract the effects of child poverty and to get them on an equal educational footing with wealthier students. He worked with 12 other professionals from various fields such as mental and physical health, education, social work, and developmental psychology. Bronfenbrenner convinced the panel to focus efforts on involving a child's family and community in the intervention effort, so as to expand the program to also focus on the creation of a better environment for development. The panel's recommendations led to the formation of the Head Start in 1965. Bronfenbrenner's input may have helped Head Start develop some of its environmental intervention methods, such as family support services, home visits, and education for parenthood.

Legacy and influence
According to Melvin L. Kohn, a sociologist from Johns Hopkins University, Bronfenbrenner was critical in making social scientists realize that, "...interpersonal relationships, even [at] the smallest level of the parent-child relationship, did not exist in a social vacuum but were embedded in the larger social structures of community, society, economics and politics." His theory also helped to push developmental research into conducting observations and experiments to discern the impact of certain environmental variables on human development. His research and ideas were also influential in the formation and direction of Head Start (see above). Bronfenbrenner's teaching in the Department of Human Development at Cornell University produced a large number of developmental researchers who are now, as Cornell University claims, "leaders in the field."

Awards
 The James McKeen Catell Award from the American Psychological Society
 The American Psychological Association renamed its "Lifetime Contribution to Developmental Psychology in the Service of Science and Society" as "The Bronfenbrenner Award."
 Chair, 1970 White House Conference on Children

Publications
 Two Worlds of Childhood: US and USSR. Simon & Schuster, 1970. 
 Influencing Human Development. Holt, Rinehart & Winston, 1973. 
 Influences on Human Development. Holt, Rinehart & Winston, 1975. 
 The Ecology of Human Development: Experiments by Nature and Design. Cambridge, MA: Harvard University Press, 1979. 
 The State of Americans: This Generation and the Next. New York: Free Press, 1996. 
 Making Human Beings Human: Bioecological Perspectives on Human Development. Sage, 2005.

References

External links

Guide to the Urie Bronfenbrenner Papers

Obituary: "Urie Bronfenbrenner; theories altered approach to child development; at 88" by Elaine Woo, Los Angeles Times. September 29, 2005.
Cornell News Release on Bronfenbrenner's Death

20th-century American psychologists
Jewish American social scientists
Systems psychologists
American developmental psychologists
Early childhood education in the United States
Soviet emigrants to the United States
Cornell University faculty
Cornell University alumni
Harvard Graduate School of Education alumni
University of Michigan alumni
Deaths from diabetes
1917 births
2005 deaths
American people of Russian descent
Human ecologists
20th-century American Jews
21st-century American Jews